The Siecha Lakes are three glacial lakes located in the Chingaza Natural National Park in Cundinamarca, Colombia. The Andean lakes are considered sacred in the religion of the Muisca who inhabited the area before the Spanish conquest of the Muisca in the 1530s.

Etymology 
In the Chibcha language of the Muisca Siecha means "House of the Lord".

Description 
The Siecha Lakes consist of three small glacial lakes, from large to small and east to west; Siecha (63,893 m²), Guasca (56,846 m²) and De los Patos (20,662 m²). Alternative names for the smaller two are Fausto and America. The lakes belong to the municipality of Guasca. Fauna around the lakes are the birds American purple gallinule, helmeted curassow, torrent duck, Andean cock-of-the-rock, eagles and orange-fronted parakeet. In the lakes the birds Oxyura jamaicensis andina, Andean teal and the American coot can be found. Mammals around the lakes include the spectacled bear, white-tailed deer, red deer and the little red brocket.

History 
In the colonial period, the lakes were partly drained to extract the golden artefacts of the Muisca from the water. In 1855 a golden raft was found in one of the lakes, similar to the famous Muisca raft. It was named Balsa de Siecha or "Siecha raft" and pictured in the book El Dorado by Muisca scholar Liborio Zerda in 1883. The discovery of the raft made Zerda believe that the site of the initiation ritual of the new zipa was not in Lake Guatavita, yet in the Siecha Lakes. Later, the raft was more-or-less legally taken from Colombia to Europe. The transporting ship burnt in the harbour of Bremen and the raft was lost.

Tourism 
To visit the lakes certain rules apply; visits are only possible on Saturdays and Sundays, access at the entrance point needs to be not later than 10:00 AM and exit not after 4:00 PM. A maximum of 30 visitors per day is allowed.

See also 
 Liborio Zerda
 Muisca religion
 Lake Guatavita, Lake Iguaque, Lake Tota

References

Bibliography

External links 

  Hikes to the Siecha Lakes

Lakes of Colombia
Sacred lakes
Lake Siecha
Tourist attractions in Cundinamarca Department
Muisca and pre-Muisca sites
Lakes
Siecha